Bothriodon (Greek: "pit" (botros), "teeth" (odontes)) is an extinct genus of anthracotheriid artiodactyl from the late Eocene to early Oligocene of Asia, Europe, and North America. It was about the size of a large pig, reaching an estimated weight of more than 199 kg (439 lbs).

References

Further reading
 The Beginning of the Age of Mammals by Kenneth D. Rose  
 Mammoths, Sabertooths, and Hominids by Jordi Agusti and Mauricio Anton

Anthracotheres
Eocene even-toed ungulates
Eocene mammals of Asia
Eocene mammals of Europe
Eocene mammals of North America
Prehistoric even-toed ungulate genera